Below is the list of broadcasting right holders for UEFA Euro 2012. European Broadcasting Union and Sportfive acted as the agent who responsible for TV right sales in Europe and Asia-Pacific respectively. Eurosport also secured the rights to broadcast the matches on tape delay in 58 European countries.

Television
In January 2012, it was announced that Telekomunikacja Polska and Orange had successfully completed the first phase of tests of the technology infrastructure and services to be provided during the competition to bring connectivity to over twenty locations in Poland (host cities, stadiums, hotels for UEFA representatives) and between Poland and Ukraine.

According to UEFA requirements, TP ensured approximately 2х70 Gbit/s data communication speed from Polish stadiums and 2х140 Gbit/s between Poland and Ukraine. This was required due to the fact that the matches were broadcast in HD quality. The multilateral production utilised 31 cameras to cover the action on and around the pitch at every match, with additional cameras following activities around the game, such as team arrivals at the stadiums, interviews, and media conferences. The official Euro 2012 broadcasting centre was located at the Expo XXI International Centre in Warsaw.

UEFA

Rest of the world

Radio
Apart from European Broadcasting Union which land the rights in June 2011, below is the list of confirmed radio broadcasters for the tournament:

References

UEFA Euro 2012
2012